Tiago André Lopes Moreira (born 27 April 1988) is a Portuguese professional footballer who plays for S.C. Covilhã as a right-back.

Club career
Born in Felgueiras, Porto District, Moreira spent most of his youth career in the ranks of FC Porto but played only lower-level senior football until May 2014, when he and AD Oliveirense teammate Zé Tiago signed for S.C. Covilhã. He played regularly in two Segunda Liga seasons for the club, and scored in a 3–1 away win against Sporting CP B on 31 January 2016.

On 31 May 2016, Moreira moved across the league to newly relegated C.F. União, on a one-year contract with the option of a second. When this ended, he joined fellow second-tier team Leixões S.C. on a three-year deal in May 2018, reuniting with his former Covilhã manager Francisco Chaló. He was used almost exclusively in cup games, making only one league appearance and returning to the Estádio Municipal José dos Santos Pinto on 28 December.

References

External links

Portuguese League profile 

1988 births
Living people
People from Felgueiras
Sportspeople from Porto District
Portuguese footballers
Association football defenders
Liga Portugal 2 players
Segunda Divisão players
Padroense F.C. players
G.D. Ribeirão players
A.D. Lousada players
AD Oliveirense players
S.C. Covilhã players
C.F. União players
Leixões S.C. players